Burenka is a rural locality (a settlement) in Chaykovsky, Perm Krai, Russia. The population was 630 as of 2010. There are 12 streets.

Geography 
Burenka is located 45 km southeast of Chaykovsky. Zipunovo is the nearest rural locality.

References 

Rural localities in Chaykovsky urban okrug